NS20, NS 20, NS-20, NS.20, or variation, may refer to:

Places
 Novena MRT station (station code: NS20), Novena, Singapore; a mass transit station
 Guysborough-Eastern Shore-Tracadie (constituency N.S. 20), Nova Scotia, Canada; a provincial electoral district

Technology
 NS-20 inertial navigation system, for the D37D flight computer of the LGM-118 Peacekeeper
 Travan NS20, data backup tape standard
 Element NS20, a brand of e-cigarette

Other uses
 Lakshya (2021 film), codenamed "NS20"
 New Penguin Shakespeare volume 20
 Blue Origin NS-20, a Blue Origin suborbital spaceflight by the New Shepard space capsule on 31 March 2022

See also

 NS (disambiguation)
 20 (disambiguation)